Stefan Melentijević (born 20 March 2004) is a Serbian football player who plays as a centre-back for the Russian club Khimki.

Club career
On 11 February 2023, Melentijević signed a three-and-a-half-year contract with Russian Premier League club Khimki. He made his RPL debut for Khimki on 12 March 2023 in a game against Zenit St. Petersburg.

References

External links
 
 

2004 births
People from Herceg Novi
Living people
Serbian footballers
Serbia youth international footballers
Association football defenders
FK Radnički Beograd players
FC Khimki players
Serbian First League players
Russian Premier League players
Serbian expatriate footballers
Expatriate footballers in Russia
Serbian expatriate sportspeople in Russia